The John Riordan Three-Decker is an historic three-decker house in Worcester, Massachusetts.  Built in 1888, it is a rare survivor of the earliest phase of three-decker construction in the area northwest of Worcester's downtown.  It has a single story entry porch, and an atypical square projecting bay (rather than the more typical angled bay) flanking the entry.  Its early occupants were lower-income white collar workers, and skilled blue collar workers, predominantly Irish in origin.

The house was listed on the National Register of Historic Places in 1990.

See also
National Register of Historic Places listings in northwestern Worcester, Massachusetts
National Register of Historic Places listings in Worcester County, Massachusetts

References

Apartment buildings in Worcester, Massachusetts
Apartment buildings on the National Register of Historic Places in Massachusetts
Queen Anne architecture in Massachusetts
Houses completed in 1888
Triple-decker apartment houses
National Register of Historic Places in Worcester, Massachusetts